Myopites variofasciatus is a species of tephritid or fruit flies in the genus Myopites of the family Tephritidae.

Distribution
Egypt, Israel.

References

Tephritinae
Insects described in 1903
Taxa named by Theodor Becker
Diptera of Africa
Diptera of Europe